is one of the eleven wards in the city of Kyoto, in Kyoto Prefecture, Japan. Its name means "central capital ward."

As of 2021, the ward has an estimated population of 109,629 people. Tourism, shopping, and entertainment are the primary sources of income in the area. The Kamo River flows through the district in the area known as Kawaramachi. The three most famous festivals of Kyoto, the Aoi Matsuri, the Gion Matsuri, and the Jidai Matsuri can all be seen in Nakagyō-ku. It is also home to several historical places and temples.

Demographics

Temples and landmarks
Nijō Castle a former residence for the Tokugawa Shogunate
Kyoto International Manga Museum
Nishiki Market
Museum of Kyoto
Kyoto Art Center

Economy
The ward is home to the headquarters of several companies:
Q-Games
Shimadzu, in Nishinokyo-Kuwabara-cho
Nichicon, in Karasuma-dori Oike-agaru
Hatena, in Karasuma-dori Rokkaku-sagaru
Keifuku Electric Railroad, in Shijō-Ōmiya Nishi-Iru

Education

Colleges and universities
 Hanazono University
 
 Suzaku campus, Ritsumeikan University
 Nijo campus, Bukkyo University

References

External links

  

Wards of Kyoto